Mastersonia is an extinct genus of non-mammalian therapsids from the Lower Permian of San Angelo Formation, Texas. It is only known from a few, very large vertebrae.

See also

 List of therapsids

References

 The main groups of non-mammalian synapsids at Mikko's Phylogeny Archive
 

Tapinocephalian genera
Extinct animals of the United States
Permian synapsids
Fossil taxa described in 1962
Taxa named by Everett C. Olson